Ball Four is a book written by former Major League Baseball pitcher Jim Bouton (1939-2019) in 1970. The book is a diary of Bouton's 1969 season, spent with the Seattle Pilots and then the Houston Astros following a late-season trade. In it, Bouton also recounts much of his baseball career, spent mainly with the New York Yankees.

Despite its controversy at the time, with baseball commissioner Bowie Kuhn's attempts to discredit it and label it as detrimental to the sport, it is considered to be one of the most important sports books ever written and the only sports-themed book to make the New York Public Library's 1996 list of Books of the Century. It also is listed in Time magazine's 100 greatest non-fiction books of all time.

Summary 

Bouton befriended sportswriter Leonard Shecter during his time with the Yankees. Shecter approached him with the idea of writing and publishing a season-long diary. Bouton, who had taken some notes during the  season after having a similar idea, readily agreed. The book chronicled the 1969 season, which was the Seattle Pilots' only operating season, though Bouton was traded to Houston late in the year.

Ball Four described a side of baseball that was previously unseen by writing about the obscene jokes, drunken womanizing, and routine drug use among players, including by Bouton himself. Bouton wrote with candor about the anxiety he felt over his pitching and his role on the team. Bouton detailed his unsatisfactory relationships with teammates and management alike, his sparring sessions with Pilots manager Joe Schultz and pitching coach Sal Maglie, and the lies and minor cheating that has gone on in baseball.

Bouton disclosed how rampant amphetamine or "greenies" usage was among players. Also revealed was the heavy drinking of Yankee legend Mickey Mantle, which had previously been kept almost entirely out of the press. Bouton additionally described clashes with his coaches (usually about his role with the team, his opinion that he should use the knuckleball exclusively, and his desire to throw between outings) and his outspoken views on politics.

Title

The book's title was suggested by a female customer of a tavern called the Lion's Head in New York City's Greenwich Village neighborhood. Having recently completed the manuscript, Bouton and Shecter were discussing the book at the bar, lamenting the fact that with the book ready for print they still had not arrived on an acceptable name. According to Bouton:

<blockquote>At that moment, this drunk lady at the bar said, 'Why don't you call it Ball Four?''' We laughed about it and thought it was pretty funny, and as we're walking through the streets later, [Shecter] said, 'You know, Ball Four is not a bad name.'</blockquote>

Critical reactionBall Four proved to be commercially successful. The first edition was published in an edition of just 5,000 copies and quickly sold out. Reprints, translations, and new editions ensued, with the book ultimately selling millions of copies worldwide, with the book gaining cachet as a baseball classic.

Negative reaction
Baseball commissioner Bowie Kuhn called Ball Four "detrimental to baseball," and tried to force Bouton to sign a statement saying that the book was completely fictional. Bouton refused to deny any of Ball Four's revelations. Many of Bouton's teammates never forgave him for publicly airing what he had learned in private about their flaws and foibles. The book made Bouton unpopular with many players, coaches and officials on other teams as well, as they felt he had betrayed the long-standing rule: "What you see here, what you say here, what you do here, let it stay here." Pete Rose took to yelling "Fuck you, Shakespeare!" from the dugout whenever Bouton was pitching. Many of the day's sportswriters also denounced Bouton, with Dick Young leading the way, calling Bouton and Shecter "social lepers".

Although Bouton wrote about Mickey Mantle mostly in a positive light, his comments on Mantle's excesses spawned most of the book's notoriety, and provoked Bouton's essential blacklisting from baseball. Bouton tried several times to make peace with Mantle, but not until Bouton sent a condolence note after Mantle's son Billy died of cancer in 1994 did Mantle contact Bouton. The two former teammates reconciled not long before Mantle's death in 1995.

Hank Aaron, Leo Durocher, Mickey Mantle and Tom Gorman, each of whom had, at one time or another, been either directly or indirectly associated with Bouton, expressed their opinions on the book, none of them favorable, on a 1979 episode of The Dick Cavett Show.

Legacy

The following year Bouton described the fallout from Ball Four and his ensuing battles with Commissioner Kuhn and others in another book, titled I'm Glad You Didn't Take It Personally. The title was Dick Young's response when Bouton joked with him about his "social leper" comment.

In 1976, Ball Four became the inspiration for an eponymous television sitcom. Bouton starred as "Jim Barton", a baseball player who was also a writer with a preoccupation with his teammates' personal lives. The show was canceled after five episodes.

See also

 Jim Brosnan, Major League pitcher and author of a similar tell-all, The Long SeasonFootnotes

Further reading

 Mark Armour, Ball Four, Society for American Baseball Research, 2006.
 Kevin Baxter, "Jim Bouton's 'Ball Four' is Still Going On Strong," Los Angeles Times,'' Sept. 15, 2010.

1969 Major League Baseball season
1970 non-fiction books
Houston Astros
Major League Baseball books
Seattle Pilots